Hans Ehlich (born 1 July 1901, in Leipzig – 30 March 1991 in Braunschweig) was a doctor and SS-Standartenführer (colonel) of Nazi Germany during World War II.  He was the commander of Amtsgruppe III B Volkstum und Volksgesundheit in the Sicherheitsdienst (SD) in occupied Poland.

Career 
Ehlich began his studies in medicine and dentistry in Leipzig and Würzburg. Around 1923, Ehlich became involved with various right wing movements, and took part in preparations for Hitler's November putsch in 1923 in Munich. After passing his medical exams, Ehlich took up a position in 1927 as a physician in the City Hospital in Johannstadt, Dresden. He joined the Nazi Party on 1 December 1931. In February 1932, he opened a private medical practice.

Shortly before end of war in Berlin, the remaining officers in the RSHA, including Ehlich destroyed incriminating documents and established new identities. In Flensburg, Ehlich worked until 13 May 1945 with the press agency of the acting German government of  Admiral Dönitz. On 23 May 1945 all of its members were arrested. Ehlich was able to avoid arrest. However, in July 1945 British investigators finally caught up with him and other leaders of the former RSHA.

Post-war 
After being released from internment, Ehlich again practised as a physician. In October 1948, he was condemned as a former member of the SS, defined at Nuremberg as being a criminal organization, and sentenced to one year and nine months in prison. Since the punishment was considered time already served, Ehlich was able to establish himself in Braunschweig as a physician. Several preliminary investigations in the sixties did not lead to further prosecution. Ehlich worked and continued to live in Braunschweig, where he died on 30 March 1991.

References 
Michael Wildt: Generation des Unbedingten. Das Führungskorps des Reichssicherheitshauptamtes. Hamburger Edition HIS Verlagsges. mbH, 2002, 
Helmut Krausnick/Hans-Heinrich Wilhelm: Die Truppe des Weltanschauungskrieges. Die Einsatzgruppen der Sicherheitspolizei und des SD 1938-1942. Deutsche Verlags-Anstalt, Stuttgart 1981, 

1901 births
1991 deaths
SS-Standartenführer
Physicians in the Nazi Party
German military doctors
Physicians from Leipzig
Einsatzgruppen personnel
People from the Kingdom of Saxony
Reich Security Main Office personnel